Sharman is a British television crime drama series, based on the Nick Sharman books by London-based author Mark Timlin, that first broadcast on 5 April 1995. Broadcast on ITV, the series stars Clive Owen in the title role of Sharman, a private detective operating out of a private office in South London. The series began in the form of a pilot, based on the novel The Turnaround, before being developed into four further feature-length stories, each based upon one of Timlin's novels; only the final episode, "Pretend We're Dead", differs from the plot of the original novel; aside from the final scene, the remainder of the plot is an original composition by writer Mick Ford.

Aside from Owen, the series featured two other regular cast members in the form of John Salthouse, who appears as Detective Inspector Jack Robber, a seedy but cunning police officer; and Roberta Taylor who appears as Aggie, Sharma's secretary. Guest cast featured in the series include the likes of Ray Winstone, Keith Allen, and Samantha Janus, who is also pictured on the series DVD cover, despite only appearing in a single episode.

The Turnaround was first released on VHS in 1995, before the entire series, was released on DVD via Network on 1 October 2012. Timlin's novels were also reprinted to feature images of Clive Owen on the cover.

Cast

Regular Cast
 Clive Owen as Nick Sharman
 John Salthouse as Detective Inspector Jack Robber
 Roberta Taylor as Aggie

Supporting Cast

The Turnaround
 Bill Paterson as James Webb
 Rowena King as Fiona
 Matthew Marsh as Tony Hogan

Take the A-Train
 Samantha Womack as Jane
 Clarence Smith as Cedric
 Gina Bellman as Kiki
 Patrick Baladi as George

Hearts of Stone
 Keith Allen as Brady
 Julie Graham as Kylie
 Steven Hartley as Paul O'Dowd
 Grant Masters as Joe Lancer

A Good Year for the Roses
 Marianne Jean-Baptiste as Precious
 Mark Moraghan as Dicks
 Cliff Parisi as Terry Southall
 Kelly Reilly as Sophie Bright
 Hugo Speer as Mayles
 Ray Winstone as George Bright

Pretend We're Dead
 Adie Allen as Dawn
 Anton Lesser as Galilee
 Colette Brown as Tracey
 Danny Webb as Durban

Episodes

Pilot (1995)

Series (1996)

References

External links
 
 
 Nick Sharman

1995 British television series debuts
1996 British television series endings
1990s British drama television series
ITV television dramas
Television shows based on British novels
Carlton Television
1990s British crime television series
Television series by ITV Studios
English-language television shows
Television shows set in London